Nigel Richard Mark Heath (born 1 July 1955) is an ex-rally driver from England. He raced in 40 World Rally Championship events, despite not scoring a single point, and also in the PWRC in 1999 and 2006.

In 2008, he was arrested for fraud and corruption in his local Britain relating to his other job as a solicitor.

References

External links
 eWRC results

English rally drivers
English solicitors
1955 births
World Rally Championship drivers
Living people